Katleen Vermeiren (born 23 September 1978) is a Cyclo cross rider and road cyclist from Belgium. She is the 2001 Belgium cyclo cross champion. On the road she represented her nation at the 2005 UCI Road World Championships.

References

External links
 profile at Procyclingstats.com

1978 births
Belgian female cyclists
Living people
People from Herentals
Cyclists from Antwerp Province